Christian Anders (15 January 1945 in Bruck an der Mur, Austria as Antonio Augusto Schinzel-Tenicolo) is an Austrian singer, musician, composer, author and conspiracy theorist.

Life 
In his childhood he lived with his family in Cagliari, Sardinia. When he was 10 years old, his family came to Germany and lived in Offenbach am Main. After school he became an electrician. Anders began to sing German schlager songs and was famous as a singer during the 1970s and 1980s.

In the 1970s he wrote some novels. Around 2000 he started writing several books with esoteric and conspiracy theory content under the pseudonym Lanoo.

Since 2006 Anders has been married to Birgit Diehn.

Conspiracy theories 

 Anders is anti-vaccination and described in an interview "children's vaccinators" as "child molesters", claiming that without exception all vaccinations were completely ineffective and would only trigger and spread the disease that they were supposed to prevent.
 Regarding the crash of Germanwings flight 9525 in 2015, which had been caused by the pilot, Anders argued that the passengers had already been killed by organ procurement before the start of the flight.
 On the Corona pandemic, he published the pseudo-scientific book Corona. Fakt oder Fake? and the children's book Die Abenteuermaus und die Corona Helden. In a new version of his best-known song, titled Es fährt ein Zug nach Corona, he shares the view that Covid-19 is just the influenza that politicians and the pharmaceutical industry want to make money from. Oliver Kalkofe recorded a parody of Anders' short video.

Songs 

 "Als wir uns trafen" (1968)
 "Spanischer Wein" (1968)
 "Mexico" (1968)
 "Little Girl" (1968)
 "Happy Love" (1968)
 "Geh' nicht vorbei" (1969)
 "Sylvia" (1969)
 "Morgen abend" (1969)
 "Ein Mann weint keine Träne" (1970)
 "Du gehörst zu mir" (1970)
 "Nie mehr allein" (1970)
 "Von Mann zu Mann" (1971)
 "Dich will ich lieben" (1971)
 "Ich lass Dich nicht gehn" (1971)
 "Du hast sie verloren" (1971)
 "Das schönste Mädchen das es gibt" (1971)
 "Maria Lorena" (1971)
 "Es fährt ein Zug nach Nirgendwo" (1972)
 "Train To Nowhere Land" (1972)
 "6 Uhr früh in den Straßen" (1972)
 "In den Augen der anderen" (1972)
 "It's Out of My Hands" (1973)
 "Six O'Clock in The Morning" (1973)
 "Das Schiff der großen Illusionen" (1973)
 "Einsamkeit hat viele Namen" (1974)
 "Niemandsland" (1974)
 "Wer liebt hat keine Wahl" (1974)
 "Ich leb nur für Dich allein" (1974)
 "Hühnerbeinchen. Hörspiel mit vielen lustigen Liedern" (Kindermusical von Christian Anders und Kurt Vethake)" (1974)
 "Der letzte Tanz" (1975)
 "Wenn Die Liebe Dich Vergißt (1975)
 "Der Brief" (1976)
 "Nur Worte?" (1976)
 "Mädchen Namenlos" (1976)
 "Love Dreamer" (1977)
 "Tu's nicht Jenny" (1977)
 "Dann kamst du" (1977)
 "Denn ich liebe dich so sehr" (1977)
 "Tokio Girl" (1977)
 "Do You Love Me / als Archibald" (1977)
 "Lass es uns tun" (1978)
 "Endstation" (1978)
 "Verliebt in den Lehrer" (1978)
 "Ich kann dich nicht vergessen" (1978)
 "Am Strand von Las Chapas" (1978)
 "Love, das ist die Antwort" (1979)
 "Es war liebe" (1979)
 "Ruby" (1979)
 "Donnerstag, der 13. Mai" (1979)
 "Du gehst" (1980)
 "Will ich zuviel?" (1980)
 "König dieser Welt" (1980)
 "Sag ihr das ich sie liebe" (1980)
 "Was wird nach dieser Nacht" (1981)
 "Zwanzig Stunden bis Jane" (1981)
 "Gebrochenes Juwel" (1981)
 "Ein Mann zuviel" (1981)
 "Zusammen sind wir stark" (1982)
 "Ist es schon zu spät" (1982)
 "Wie leb'ich ohne dich?" (1982)
 "Hinter verschlossenen Türen" (1985)
 "Wie vom Winde verweht" (1985)
 "Zu stolz" (1985)
 "Die Mauer/The Wall" (1987)
 "Lanoo – Alive in America" (1991)
 "Der Untergang des Taro Torsay" (Musical)
 "Der Tag an dem die Erde stillstand" (2001)
 "Explosive Leidenschaft" (2006)
 "Martine"
 "Gespensterstadt 2009" (2009)
 "Ruby 2010" (2010)
 "Hinter verschlossenen Türen 2011" (2010)

Books

Novels 
 Gobbo. Und der Teufel singt sein Lied. Ein Sex-Psycho-Western für eine Nacht. 3-Ass-Verlag, Munich 1970
 Der Blutschrei. Hirthammer, Munich 1971
 Der Brief. Presse-Service, Zürich 1976
 Der Freigänger. Eine junge Liebe zwischen Freiheit und Strafvollzug. Schweizer Verlagshaus, Zürich 1977; 2. veränd. A. 2003, 
 Karatemeister Steve Tender. Odyssee der Rache. Schweizer Verlagshaus, Zürich 1977

As "Lanoo" 
 Lanoo: Seelen-Atem Meditation. Der Weg zur wahren Unsterblichkeit. 
 Lanoo: Der Mann, der AIDS erschuf. (2000) 
 Lanoo: Das Geheimnis der sieben Siegel. (2000) 
 Lanoo: Das illustrierte Buch des Lichts. Ursprung und Bestimmung von Mensch und Universum. (2001) 
 Lanoo: Der wahre Bankenschwindel. Und was man dagegen tun kann. (2002) 
 Lanoo: Der Rubel muss rollen! 
 Lanoo: Darwin irrt! 
 Lanoo: Literarischer Rebell. (2004)

Filmography 
 1970: How Did a Nice Girl Like You Get Into This Business?
 1970: When the Mad Aunts Arrive
 1971: Wir hau'n den Hauswirt in die Pfanne
 1971: Das haut den stärksten Zwilling um
 1979: Die Brut des Bösen
 1980: Die Todesgöttin des Liebescamps
 1986: Death Stone
 1991: Das Mädchen aus dem Fahrstuhl

References 

20th-century Austrian male singers
Austrian male writers
Schlager musicians
Living people
1945 births